Tarranyurk is a locality in western Victoria, Australia.

Tarranyurk has a fire brigade under the Country Fire Authority.

The main industry in the Tarranyurk district is broadacre agriculture. There are two factories in the town, GrainRite Augers and Ahrens.

References

External links

Towns in Victoria (Australia)